Bernard Walton Trafford (July 2, 1871 – January 3, 1942) was an American banker and college football and baseball player.

Personal life
Trafford was born July 2, 1871, in Dartmouth, Massachusetts to William Bradford and Rachel Mott Davis Trafford. He attended high school in Fall River, Massachusetts and graduated from Phillips Exeter Academy in 1889. He graduated Harvard in 1893.

He married Leonora Brooks Borden of Fall River on June 5, 1901. She died in 1936. Upon Trafford's death in 1942, he was survived by four daughters, a son, and eight grandchildren.

Football career
Trafford was a prominent fullback for the Harvard Crimson football team from 1889 to 1892, captain of the 1891 and 1892 teams. He kicked five field goals in a game against Cornell in 1890, a season in which Harvard was national champion. Trafford scored 64 points in a game against Wesleyan in 1891, and led the nation in scoring that year with 270 points. His teammate Everett Lake led the nation in touchdowns the same season. Trafford was captain of the first team to employ the flying wedge blocking scheme.  Trafford helped coach the 1893 team. After college, he was employed at the Bell Telephone System, then as a banker in Boston.

Banking career

Trafford served as vice president of the First National Bank of Boston from 1912 to 1923, then became president in March 1928 upon the death of Clifton H. Dwinnell. He served as vice chairman of the board from 1929 to 1935, and chairman from 1935 until his retirement.

References

1871 births
Year of death missing
19th-century players of American football
American football fullbacks
Harvard Crimson football coaches
Harvard Crimson football players
Phillips Exeter Academy alumni
Sportspeople from Fall River, Massachusetts
People from Westport, Massachusetts
Players of American football from Massachusetts